The Salem Athenaeum, founded in 1810, is one of the oldest membership libraries in the United States. The Athenaeum is located at 337 Essex Street in Salem, Massachusetts in the McIntire Historic District.

History

The Salem Athenaeum was founded in 1810 by the merger of two antecedent organizations: the Social Library, founded in 1760, and the Salem Philosophical Library, founded in 1781. The first president was Edward Augustus Holyoke.

The Athenaeum's first permanent building was constructed in the 1850s with a large bequest from Caroline Plummer. In 1905 the Athenaeum sold that building and used the proceeds to build their current facility, which was dedicated in 1907.

The collections include over 50,000 volumes on diverse topics.

Notable proprietors

Frank Weston Benson
Nathaniel Bowditch
Nathaniel Hawthorne

See also
 John Tucker Daland House
 Salem Philosophical Library (1781–1810), predecessor to the Athenaeum
 Salem Social Library (1760–1810), predecessor to the Athenaeum

References

Further reading
 Catalogue of the library of the Athenaeum in Salem, Massachusetts. 1842.
 The Salem Athenæum, 1810–1910  by Joseph Nickerson Ashton (Berkeley Press, 1917)

External links

 

 

Libraries in Massachusetts
1810 establishments in Massachusetts
Historic preservation organizations in the United States
History of Massachusetts
History of New England
Art museums and galleries in Massachusetts
Libraries in Essex County, Massachusetts
Subscription libraries in the United States
Libraries established in 1810
Library buildings completed in 1907